Luis Rego (born 30 May 1943) is a French actor, comedian, writer and director, of Portuguese origins. He was a founding member of music/comedy group Les Charlots which he left after a few years.

Theater

Filmography

References

External links 

French male film actors
Living people
20th-century French male actors
21st-century French male actors
French male stage actors
French male television actors
1943 births
French people of Portuguese descent